Buzești may refer to several villages in Romania:

 Buzești, a village in the commune Crasna, Gorj County
 Buzești, a village in the commune Fărcașa, Maramureș County
 Buzești, a village in the commune Corbu, Olt County